Mohamed Zahid Hossain (born 15 June 1988) is a Bangladeshi footballer who last played as a winger for Chittagong Abahani. He made his international debut in 2006.

International goals

National team
Scores and results list Bangladesh's goal tally first.

References

Living people
1988 births
Bangladeshi footballers
Bangladesh international footballers
Sheikh Russel KC players
Association football midfielders
Footballers at the 2006 Asian Games
Footballers at the 2010 Asian Games
Footballers at the 2014 Asian Games
Asian Games competitors for Bangladesh
Arambagh KS players
South Asian Games gold medalists for Bangladesh
South Asian Games medalists in football